LSPR may refer to:

Surface plasmon resonance or also called localized surface plasmon resonance
Latvian Soviet Socialist Republic (in Latvian: Latvijas Sociālistiskā Padomju Republika)
Lake Superior Performance Rally, a rally race held in Michigan